The 2016 Ando Securities Open was a professional tennis tournament played on outdoor hard courts. It was the 2nd edition of the tournament and part of the 2016 ITF Women's Circuit, offering a total of $100,000 in prize money. It took place in Tokyo, Japan, on 7–13 November 2016.

Singles main draw entrants

Seeds 

 1 Rankings as of 31 October 2016.

Other entrants 
The following player received a wildcard into the singles main draw:
  Mayo Hibi
  Yuki Naito
  Makoto Ninomiya

The following player received entry by a protected ranking:
  Jana Fett

The following player received entry by a junior exempt:
  Dalma Gálfi

The following players received entry from the qualifying draw:
  Miharu Imanishi
  Jamie Loeb
  An-Sophie Mestach
  Junri Namigata

Champions

Singles

 Zhang Shuai def.  Dalma Gálfi, 4–6, 7–6(7–2), 6–2

Doubles

 Rika Fujiwara /  Yuki Naito def.  Jamie Loeb /  An-Sophie Mestach, 6–4, 6–7(12–14), [10–8]

External links 
 2016 Ando Securities Open at ITFtennis.com
 Official website

2016 ITF Women's Circuit
2016 in Japanese tennis